"Lovey Dovey" is a popular American rhythm and blues song originating in the 1950s.

Lovey Dovey may also refer to:

 "Lovey-Dovey" (T-ara song), 2012
 Lovey Dovey (TV series), a 2016 Thai television series

See also
LoveyDove, an American musical duo